George Weldrick (1 January 1882 – 14 April 1953) was an English cricketer.  Weldrick was a right-handed batsman.  He was born at Brighouse, Yorkshire.

Weldrick made his first-class debut for Warwickshire against Yorkshire in the 1906 County Championship.  The following season he made seven further first-class appearances for the county, the last of which came against Leicestershire in the 1907 County Championship.  He struggled with the bat in eight first-class appearances for the county, scoring 53 runs at an average of 5.30, with a high score of 12.

He died at the place of his birth on 14 April 1953.

References

External links
George Weldrick at ESPNcricinfo
George Weldrick at CricketArchive

1882 births
1953 deaths
People from Brighouse
English cricketers
Warwickshire cricketers
Sportspeople from Yorkshire